Ngoyo was an Iron Age kingdom state of the Woyo ethnic group, located in the south of Cabinda (present-day Democratic Republic of the Congo and Angola).  Located on the Atlantic coast of Central Africa, just north of the Congo River, it was founded by Bantu-speaking people around the 15th century. Ngoyo tradition held that the kingdom's ancestors were among the earliest settlers in the area, leading their chiefs to title themselves the nfumu nsi ("lords of the earth"). The capital was Mbanza Ngoyo.
By 1700, Cabinda had become the leading slave port north of Luanda, and Ngoyo's economy rested heavily on the sale of slaves.

In 1783, Ngoyo joined forces with the neighboring state of Kakongo to destroy a Portuguese fort. However, the kingdom was soon undone by the growing financial burden that the kingship entailed.  With fewer and fewer possible claimants seeking the office, the kingdom effectively disintegrated in the 1830s after the nobles failed to elect a new king. In 1885, the Ngoyo signed the Treaty of Simulambuco with Portugal, and became a protectorate of that nation.

See also
 Woyo masks
 Cimpaba

References

Martin, Phyllis M. "Family Strategies in Nineteenth-Century Cabinda."  The Journal of African History 28.1 (1987): 65-86.

External links
The origins of the kingdom of Ngoyo (in French)
Kingdom of Ngoyo
Cabinda History (in Portuguese)
History of Cabinda (in French)

Iron Age cultures of Africa
Countries in ancient Africa
History of Central Africa
Early modern Angola
History of the Democratic Republic of the Congo
Former countries in Africa
States and territories established in the 15th century
States and territories disestablished in the 1830s
15th-century establishments in Africa
1830s disestablishments in Africa